Sparganothoides vinolenta is a species of moth of the family Tortricidae. It is found in Mexico (Distrito Federal and Veracruz).

The length of the forewings is 10–12.8 mm for males and about 12.7 mm for females. The ground colour of the forewings is yellowish white and brownish yellow to golden yellow. The hindwings are white.

References

Moths described in 1913
Sparganothoides